Shreedev Bhattarai ( Bhesh Kumar Bhattarai) (Nepali: श्रीदेव भट्टरार्इ; born 1983) is a Nepali actor and lyricist. He was born in Ilam, eastern Nepal.

Career 
He debuted in silver screen through movie Bhaimara and also has worked in some other movies. He has worked in more than 10 dozens music videos as model. He has shared screen with artists of Nepali film industry like Dinesh Sharma, Sushil Chhetri, Garima Panta, Jiwan Luitel, Anu Shah, Namrata Sapkota, Dinesh D.C., Sushil Pokharel, Surbir Pandit, Ramchandra Adhikari, Dipasha B.C., Anju Niraula, etc. and has also worked with filmmakers like Madhab Raj Kharel, Bhabindra Tamang, Madhusudan Bhattarai, Shiva Ghimire, Kajish Shrestha, Rupesh Upreti, etc. He also has worked with the veteran singers of Nepali music industry like Rajesh Payal Rai, Pramod Kharel, Aditya Narayan Jha, Anju Panta, Satya Raj Acharya, Sworup Raj Acharya, Shiva Pariyar, Mandabi Tripathi, etc.

Awards and honors

Awards

Honors

References 

Living people
1983 births
People from Ilam District
Nepalese actors